Susady-Ebalak (Susaźı-Yabalaq) is a rural locality (a selo) and the administrative centre of Pevomaysky Selsoviet, Yanaulsky District, Bashkortostan, Russia. The population was 402 as of 2010. There are 7 streets.

Geography 
Susady-Ebalak is located 11 km south of Yanaul (the district's administrative centre) by road. Kostino is the nearest rural locality.

References 

Rural localities in Yanaulsky District